Henning Albrecht (born 1973) is a German historian.

Life 
He is a freelance scientific consultant for the magazine Geo and has published numerous books as a writer since 2008. In 2016, Albrecht published a comprehensive biography of the Hamburg 6, artist Horst Janssen, for which he did five years of research.

Publications 
 Antiliberalismus und Antisemitismus. Hermann Wagener und die preußischen Sozialkonservativen 1855–1873. Otto-von-Bismarck-Stiftung. Wissenschaftliche Reihe; Band 12. Paderborn: Schöningh, 2010,  (Review).
 „Pragmatisches Handeln zu sittlichen Zwecken“. Helmut Schmidt und die Philosophie (Studien der Helmut und Loki Schmidt-Stiftung; vol. 4). Ed. Temmen, Bremen 2008, .
 Antiliberalismus und Antisemitismus. Hermann Wagener und die preußischen Sozialkonservativen 1855–1873 (: Wissenschaftliche Reihe; vol. 12). Schöningh, Paderborn/München/Wien/Zürich 2010 (zugleich gekürzte Fassung von: Hamburg, Univ., Diss., 2007).
 Alfred Beit: Hamburger und Diamantenkönig. , ed. , University Press, Hamburg 2011.
 Adolph Lewisohn: Kupfermagnat im „Goldenen Zeitalter“. Hamburgische Wissenschaftliche Stiftung, ed. Ekkehard Nümann, University Press, Hamburg 2013.
 Horst Janssen. Ein Leben. Rowohlt, Reinbek bei Hamburg 2016, .
 Diamanten, Dynamit und Diplomatie. Die . Hamburger Kaufleute in imperialer Zeit (Mäzene der Wissenschaft; vol. 20). Hamburgische Wissenschaftliche Stiftung, ed. Ekkehard Nümann, University Press, Hamburg 2018, .
 100 Jahre SBV Spar- und Bauverein Leichlingen eG. HistorikerVerlag, Hamburg 2019, .
 Troplowitz: Porträt eines Unternehmerpaares. , Wallstein Verlag, Hamburg 2020,

References

External links 
 

21st-century German historians
1973 births
Living people
Writers from Hamburg
University of Hamburg alumni